Walking Away may refer to:

 "Walkin' Away" (Clint Black song)
 "Walking Away" (Craig David song), 2000
 "Walkin' Away" (Diamond Rio song)
 "Walking Away" (Information Society song), 1988
 "Walking Away" (K.One song), 2010
 "Walking Away", a song by The Egg
 "Love Don't Let Me Go (Walking Away)", a mash-up of the song with David Guetta's "Love Don't Let Me Go"
 Walking Away, a poem by Cecil Day-Lewis, 1962
 Walking Away (Harper and Row, 1973), a children's book by Elizabeth Winthrop and illustrated by Noelle Massena
 "Walkin' Away", by Kix from Midnite Dynamite
 "Walking Away", by Lifehouse from Lifehouse
 "Walking Away", by Limp Bizkit from Gold Cobra

See also 
 Walk Away (disambiguation)